A Mandaean priest or Rabbi refers to an ordained religious leader in Mandaeism.

Overview
All priests must undergo lengthy ordination ceremonies, beginning with tarmida initiation. Mandaean religious leaders and copyists of religious texts hold the title Rabbi or in Arabic 'Sheikh'.

All Mandaean communities traditionally require the presence of a priest, since priests are required to officiate over all important religious rituals, including masbuta, masiqta, birth and wedding ceremonies. Priests also serve as teachers, scribes, and community leaders. Unfortunately, many Mandaean diaspora communities do not have easy access to priests.

Names
In Mandaean scriptures, priests are referred to as Naṣuraiia or occasionally as Tarmiduta. On the other hand, laypeople are referred to as Mandaiia. Naṣuraiia are considered to have naṣiruta, or esoteric divine knowledge. (Brikha Nasoraia describes naṣiruta as the esoteric strand of Mandaeism, similar to how Sufism is related to Islam.)

Priests
There are three types of priests in Mandaeism:

rišama "leader of the people"
ganzibria "treasurers" (from Old Persian ganza-bara "id.," Neo-Mandaic ganzeḇrānā)
tarmidia "disciples" (Neo-Mandaic tarmidānā)

Priests have lineages based on the succession of ganzibria priests who had initiated them. Priestly lineages, which are distinct from birth lineages, are typically recorded in the colophons of many Mandaean texts. The position is not hereditary, and any yalufa (yalupa), or Mandaean male who is highly knowledgeable about religious matters, is eligible to become a priest.

Traditionally, any ganzeḇrā who baptizes seven or more ganzeḇrānā may qualify for the office of rišama. The current rišama of the Mandaean community in Iraq is Sattar Jabbar Hilo al-Zahrony. In Australia, the rišama of the Mandaean community is Salah Choheili.

A shganda (šganda) or ashganda (ašganda) is a ritual assistant who helps priests with ritual duties. Prior to ordination, many priests have typically served as shganda as young men, although this is not a requirement.

History
The contemporary Mandaean priesthood can trace its immediate origins to the first half of the 19th century. In 1831, a cholera pandemic in Shushtar, Iran devastated the region and eliminated all of the Mandaean religious leaders there. Two of the surviving acolytes (šgandia), Yahia Bihram and Ram Zihrun, reestablished the Mandaean priesthood in Suq esh-Shuyuk on the basis of their own training and the texts that were available to them.

Although Mandaean priests have been exclusively male since the 1900s, Buckley (2010) presents evidence that there had historically been Mandaean priests who were women.

Clothing

Ritual clothing and accessories worn by Mandaean priests include:

Burzinqa: turban
Pandama: cloth wrapped around the mouth and lower face (similar to the Tuareg litham)
Margna: wooden staff made from an olive branch
Naṣifa: stole
Kanzala: stole, when held under the chin
Skandola: ritual iron ring with an iron chain that is used as a sacred seal. It is used to seal graves and also newborn babies on their navels.
Himiana: sacred ritual belt used by priests

Mandaean priests are dressed completely in white to symbolize radiant uthras from the World of Light.

Alms
Mandaean priests regularly receive zidqa (alms) from laypeople, since priesthood is typically a full-time occupation.

Symbolism
Symbolically, a Mandaean priest represents an uthra on earth (Tibil).

Shishlam is the personification of the prototypical or archetypal Mandaean priest.

See also
Shishlam, a literary representation of the prototypical Mandaean priest
Kohanim, priests in Judaism
Ašipu, a priest in ancient Mesopotamia

References

External links
The Worlds of Mandaean Priests